GameFace is a British sitcom created by, written by and starring Roisin Conaty. The pilot aired on Channel 4 on 23 April 2014. The first series began on E4 on 12 October 2017 and ended with the second series on Channel 4 on 14 August 2019. The show followed Marcella's (Conaty) life as she takes life coaching and attempts to find acting work.

Plot
Marcella Donoghue is trying to make it as an actress and is generally struggling through life. She is finding it hard to get acting parts and has a string of short-term jobs which she dislikes. She cannot find love since having broken up with her boyfriend of 12 years. She is in serious debt, and is living in a house share. In the meantime she spends most of her time with her life coach – attempting to find solutions to her problems – and her driving instructor.

Cast
Roisin Conaty as Marcella
Caroline Ginty as Caroline
Nina Toussaint-White as Lucie
Dylan Edwards as Billy, Marcella's brother
Damien Molony as Jon, Marcella's driving instructor
Dustin Demri-Burns as Simon, Marcella's ex-boyfriend
Karl Theobald as Graham, Marcella's therapist
Pauline McLynn as Moira, Marcella's mother
Francis Magee as Michael, Marcella's father
Tiff Stevenson as Tania, Simon's wife

Production
GameFace originated as a series of Channel 4's Comedy Blaps videos, titled Roisin Conaty: Onwards and Onwards. In April 2014, a full 22 minute-pilot aired on Channel 4. On 1 October 2015, GameFace was picked up by E4 for a full series of 6 episodes. On 8 June 2018, a second series of 6 episodes was announced by E4. It began broadcasting on Channel 4 on 17 July 2019.

Episodes

Series 1 (2017)

Series 2 (2019)

Reception
Fiona Sturges for The Guardian gave it a positive review, saying "The English standup has created a big-hearted comedy that manages to make depression and loneliness funny". Natalie Golding for Telly Binge gave it four stars saying, "E4 have clearly invested in the production, as Marcella’s surprisingly elaborate daydreams play out. Layering up her personality and backstory through throwaway comments and flashbacks, GameFace shows a sly cleverness that never gets in your face."

Awards and nominations 
Chortle Awards
 2017: Best TV (nomination)

British Comedy Guide Awards
 2017: Best New TV Sitcom (nomination)

I Talk Telly Awards
 2017: Best New Comedy (nomination)
 2017: Best Comedy Performance (Roisin Conaty, Award)

New York Festivals Awards
 2017: Comedy (Bronze Award)

Royal Television Society Craft & Design Awards
 2018: Director - Comedy Drama/Situation Comedy (Andrew Chaplin, Nomination)
 2018: Editing - Entertainment and Comedy (Charlie Fawcett, Nomination)

References

External links
 
 
 

2017 British television series debuts
2019 British television series endings
2010s British sitcoms
Channel 4 sitcoms
E4 sitcoms
English-language television shows
Television series about dysfunctional families
Television series by All3Media
Television shows set in London